Epitome of Torture is the fourteenth album by the German thrash metal band Sodom. The album debuted on the Billboard Heatseakers Chart at 25, their highest Billboard Debut ever.

The song "Katjuscha" contains melody from song "Katyusha", a World War II Soviet Russian folk song originally composed by Matvei Blanter in 1938. A music video was made for the song "Stigmatized."

Track listing

Credits
Tom Angelripper – vocals, bass
Bernd "Bernemann" Kost – lead and rhythm guitar
Markus "Makka" Freiwald – drums

Charts

References

Sodom (band) albums
2013 albums
SPV/Steamhammer albums
Albums produced by Waldemar Sorychta